Rhopalosiphum is a genus of aphid of the family Aphididae that includes 16 species worldwide.  Apart from sucking the phloem of host plants and thereby being treated in agriculture as pests, some species are vectors for viral pathogens.

Species
Species include:

Rhopalosiphum arundinariae (A. N. Tissot, 1933) 
Rhopalosiphum cerasifoliae (Fitch, 1855) 
Rhopalosiphum chusqueae (Pérez Hidalgo & Villalobos Muller, 2012) 
Rhopalosiphum enigmae (F. C. Hottes and T. H. Frison, 1931) 
Rhopalosiphum insertum (Walker, 1849) - apple-grass aphid
Rhopalosiphum maidis (Fitch, 1856) - corn leaf aphid	
Rhopalosiphum musae (Schouteden, 1906) 
Rhopalosiphum nigrum (Richards, 1960) 
Rhopalosiphum nymphaeae (Linnaeus, 1761) - water lily or plum aphid
Rhopalosiphum padi (Linnaeus, 1758) - bird cherry-oat aphid	
Rhopalosiphum padiformis (Richards, 1962) 
Rhopalosiphum parvae (Hottes and Frison, 1931) 
Rhopalosiphum rufiabdominale (Sasaki, 1899) - rice root aphid
Rhopalosiphum rufulum (Richards, 1960)

References

External links
Bird Cherry-Oat Aphid, Kansas State University, July 2008
Water lily aphid

Aphidini
Sternorrhyncha genera
Taxa named by Carl Ludwig Koch